Melissa Clark is an American food writer, cookbook author and New York Times columnist. She is the author of over 40 cookbooks and has received multiple awards from the James Beard Foundation and IACP (International Association of Culinary Professionals) for her work. Clark is a regular guest on television series such as Today show, Rachael Ray and Iron Chef America and on radio programmes such as The Splendid Table on NPR and The Leonard Lopate Show on WNYC.

Early life and education
Clark is the daughter of Dr. Julian Clark and Dr. Rita Clark, both of whom were practising psychiatrists. She is a third-generation Brooklynite and grew up in the Ditmas Park neighborhood. Her parents were avid home cooks, influenced by Julia Child. As a child, Clark spent the month of August with her family each year in Provence, France. Clark is Jewish.  

Clark attended Stuyvesant High School and then Barnard College, where she studied English and history and wrote a thesis on the role of food in Don Quixote. She graduated in 1990, then in 1994 earned an MFA from Columbia University, where she took a food-writing class taught by Betty Fussell.

Career and works
In her early career, Clark was a freelance writer for various publications, including the New York Times, and worked in "front of house" jobs at restaurants. In 2007, she began her weekly "A Good Appetite" column at The New York Times, She became a full-time staff writer at the Times in 2012, writing about 65 recipes each year for the newspaper. Clark has frequently described herself as "an advocate for the home cook" and "the voice of the home cook" in interviews.

In 2015, Clark gained attention for a recipe for guacamole with green peas that she had reported on a few years earlier (the recipe was created as a collaboration between chef Jean-Georges Vongerichten and chef de cuisine Ian Coogan for Vongerichten's restaurant ABC Cocina); the piece was re-tweeted by The New York Times and attracted viral feedback, including tweets from President Barack Obama and former Governor of Florida Jeb Bush, who all disapproved of her addition of peas to the traditional recipe ingredients. Clark's most favored ingredient is anchovies, which she praises for their versatility.

Clark has written more than 40 cookbooks, including Braise: A Journey Through International Cuisine (2007), with Daniel Boulud; East of Paris with David Bouley; The Last Course: The Desserts of Gramercy Tavern with Claudia Fleming, the former pastry chef at Gramercy Tavern in New York; and Cook This Now (2011), which focuses on seasonal cooking. Clark's cookbook Dinner: Changing the Game won an award in 2018 from the International Association of Culinary Professionals.  For The New Essentials of French Cooking, which was published in print and as a series of articles on NYT Cooking, Clark won the 2018 James Beard Foundation Journalism Award for innovative storytelling.

In 2019, Clark hosted a podcast series, Weeknight Kitchen with Melissa Clark, produced by The Splendid Table.

Personal life
Clark has married two times. In 1993, she wed Max Jonson. She is now married to Daniel Gercke, with whom she has a daughter, Dahlia. The family lives in Prospect Heights, Brooklyn.

References

External links
Official website
Melissa Clark's articles and recipes in The New York Times

Living people
Writers from Brooklyn
American cookbook writers
American food writers
Barnard College alumni
The New York Times columnists
American women columnists
People from Prospect Heights, Brooklyn
Year of birth missing (living people)
Columbia University School of the Arts alumni
James Beard Foundation Award winners